This is a list of footballers who have scored the most goals in each season in the Premier League since its inception in 1992.

1992–93
The top goalscorer in the Premier League's inaugural season was Teddy Sheringham, who scored one goal for Nottingham Forest before his early-season transfer followed by 21 for Tottenham Hotspur for a total of 22.

1993–94

1994–95

1995–96

1996–97

1997–98

1998–99

1999–2000

2000–01

2001–02

2002–03

2003–04

2004–05

2005–06

2006–07

2007–08

2008–09

2009–10

2010–11

2011–12

2012–13

2013–14

2014–15

2015–16

2016–17

2017–18

2018–19

2019–20

2020–21

2021–22

2022–23

Updated to match(es) played on 11 March 2023. Source: Premier League

See also
 Premier League Golden Boot
 List of footballers with 100 or more Premier League goals

References

Top
England
Association football player non-biographical articles